Kristoffer Söder (born May 2, 1991) is a Swedish professional ice hockey player. He is currently playing with Skövde IK of the HockeyEttan (Div.1).

Söder made his Swedish Hockey League debut playing with Karlskrona HK during the 2015–16 SHL season.

References

External links

1991 births
Living people
IF Björklöven players
Karlskrona HK players
Swedish ice hockey centres
People from Skövde Municipality
Sportspeople from Västra Götaland County